Dabola (N’ko: ߘߊߓߏߟߊ߫) is a town in central Guinea. As of 2014 it had a population of 38,617 people.
It grew around the railway line from Conakry to Kankan and is known for the Tinkisso Falls and for its important dam.

Transport
While the main line is metre gauge, the branch to Tougué is standard gauge.

Mining
Development of iron ore deposits was proposed in 1994. This would require upgrading of the understrength line from the port of Conakry or a new heavy duty line to a new port at Matakan. There are also deposits of bauxite.

Notable people
Djely Karifa

See also
 Transport in Guinea
 Railway stations in Guinea

References

Sub-prefectures of the Faranah Region